The Espresso Lab is a UAE coffeehouse chain that opened its first location in 2015 in Dubai. The company was founded by Emirati entrepreneur Ibrahim Al Mallouhi.

History 
On 15 May 2015, the first store opened in Jumeirah, Dubai. It was founded by Ibrahim Al Mallouhi, who had previously spent several years visiting coffee shops and farms around the world in order to pursue the best specialty coffee. 

In October 2017, The Espresso Lab store opened in Dubai Design District. In September 2019, it opened its third location in Qasr Al Hosn, Abu Dhabi. In 2020, the company opened a coffee roastery in Dubai, and also the online shop and delivery service were launched. In 2021, they started their own coffee beans plantation.

As of February 2021, the company operates three locations in Dubai and Abu Dhabi. The company is reported to hand-select its components, and purchasing the most expensive and highest quality beans in the world, such as from Panama-based coffee company Ninety Plus, their baristas are trained to strict international standards.

The Espresso Lab is a member of the Specialty Coffee Association (SCA) and the Specialty Coffee Association of Europe (SCAE).

External links 
 Official website

References 

Coffeehouses and cafés
Companies based in Dubai
Specialty coffees